Barbara Leigh Smith Bodichon (born Barbara Leigh Smith; 8 April 1827 – 11 June 1891) was an English educationalist and artist, and a leading mid-19th-century feminist and women's rights activist. She published her influential Brief Summary of the Laws of England concerning Women in 1854 and the English Woman's Journal in 1858. Bodichon co-founded Girton College, Cambridge (1869). Her brother was the Arctic explorer Benjamin Leigh Smith.

Family and upbringing

Barbara Bodichon was the extra-marital child of Anne Longden, a milliner from Alfreton, Derbyshire and a Whig politician, Benjamin "Ben" Leigh Smith (1783–1860), the only son of the Radical abolitionist William Smith. He had four sisters. One, Frances "Fanny" Smith, married William Nightingale (né Shore) and produced a daughter, Florence (the nurse and statistician); another, Joanna Maria, married John Bonham-Carter (1788–1838) MP and founded the Bonham Carter family.

Leigh Smith's home was in Marylebone, London, but from 1816 he inherited and bought property near Hastings: Brown's Farm near Robertsbridge, with an extant house built about 1700, and Crowham Manor, Westfield, which included . Although a member of the landed gentry, Smith held radical views. He was a Dissenter, a Unitarian, a supporter of free trade, and a benefactor to the poor. In 1826 he bore the cost of building a school for the inner city poor at Vincent Square, Westminster, and paid a penny a week towards the fees for each child, the same amount paid by their parents.

Smith met Anne Longden while on a visit to his sister in Derbyshire. She became pregnant by him and he took her to the south of England, housing her in a rented lodge at Whatlington, near Battle, East Sussex, as "Mrs Leigh", the surname of Ben Smith's relations on the nearby Isle of Wight. Barbara's birth caused scandal, as the couple did not marry. Smith rode from Brown's Farm to visit them daily, and in eight weeks Anne was pregnant again. When their son Ben was born, the four went to America for two years, during which another child was conceived.

On their return to Sussex, they lived openly together at Brown's and had two more children. After the last was born in 1833, Anne fell ill with tuberculosis. Smith leased 9 Pelham Crescent, Hastings, which faced the sea, whose healthy properties were highly regarded at the time. A local woman, Hannah Walker, was employed to look after the children. Anne did not recover and so Smith took her to Ryde, Isle of Wight, where she died in 1834.

Smith, unusually for the time, sent all his children to the local school to learn alongside working-class children, rather than sending the older males to boarding or an elite day school. He later shared financial endowments equally with all the children, both male and female, giving each an income of £300 per annum from the age of majority (21).

Life

Early in her life, Barbara showed a force of character and breadth of sympathies that would win her prominence among philanthropists and social workers. Independent income gave her a freedom not normally felt by many women and Bodichon and a group of London friends began to meet regularly in the 1850s to discuss women's rights, and became known as "The Ladies of Langham Place". This became one of the first organised women's movements in Britain. They pursued many causes vigorously, including their Married Women's Property Committee. In 1854, she published Brief Summary of the Laws of England concerning Women, which helped to promote the passage of the Married Women's Property Act 1882. During this period Bodichon became friends with the artist Anna Mary Howitt, for whom she sat on several occasions.

Bodichon's first relationship was with John Chapman, editor of the Westminster Review, but she refused to marry him and lose her legal rights. On 2 July 1857, she married an eminent French physician, Dr Eugène Bodichon, at Little Portland Street Chapel. Incidentally this was in the year that the Matrimonial Causes Act 1857, for which Bodichon had campaigned, allowed women access to divorce courts. Although  wintering for many years in Algiers, Bodichon continued to lead the movements she had initiated on behalf of Englishwomen.

In 1858, Bodichon set up the English Women's Journal, an organ to discuss direct employment and equality issues for women, in particular manual or intellectual industrial employment, expansion of employment opportunities, and reform of laws pertaining to the sexes.

In 1866, cooperating with Emily Davies, Bodichon produced a scheme to extend university education to women. The first small experiment in this, at Hitchin, developed into Girton College, Cambridge, to which Bodichon gave liberally of her time and money.

In 1869, she wrote a Brief Summary in Plain Language of the Laws of England Concerning Women which helped pass Married Women's Property Act 1870.

Bodichon was a Unitarian, who wrote of Theodore Parker: "He prayed to the Creator, the infinite Mother of us all (always using Mother instead of Father in this prayer). It was the prayer of all I ever heard in my life which was the truest to my individual soul."

On 21 November 1865 Barbara Bodichon, helped by Jessie Boucherett and Helen Taylor, brought up the idea of a parliamentary reform aimed at achieving the right to vote for women.

Despite all her public interests, Bodichon found time for society and her favourite art of painting. Bodichon studied under William Holman Hunt. Her water colours, exhibited at the Salon, the Royal Academy and elsewhere, showed originality and talent, and were admired by Corot and Daubigny. Bodichon's London salon included many literary and artistic celebrities of her day. She was an early member of the Society of Female Artists (SFA) and showed 59 art works with them between 1858 and 1886. She was George Eliot's intimate friend and the first to recognise the authorship of Adam Bede. Her personal appearance is said to have inspired "the tall, red-haired heroine of Eliot's Romola with her 'expression of proud tenacity and latent impetuousness'".

Bodichon died at Robertsbridge, Sussex, on 11 June 1891.

Education and activism
She was an English leader in the movements of education and political rights for women during the 1800s. Her marriage did not deter her from continuing her campaigns for women's rights to education.

Bodichon studied at the Ladies' College in Bedford Square founded in London, England in 1849. Here she was given instruction for work as a professional artist rather than an art instructor. Bodichon came from a liberal Unitarian family with a private income. Their independent wealth gave Bodichon more freedom to grow as an artist.

In 1852, after she had enrolled in Bedford College, she developed and opened Portman Hall School in Paddington, having researched practices at other primary schools, in conjunction with its first head teacher, Elizabeth Whitehead.

In 1854, Bodichon published the Brief Summary in Plain Language of the Most Important Laws Concerning Women, which was crucial in the passage of the Married Women's Property Act. In 1866, in collaboration with Emily Davies, she presented the idea of university education for women, being able to conduct the first experiment at a college in Hitchin, which developed into Girton College and of which Bodichon became a dedicated patron. She studied under the English artist William Henry Hunt to develop her skill in watercolours.

Bodichon belonged to the Langham Place Circle, a group of forward-thinking women artists who developed the English Woman's Journal. During the 1850s, this group fought for women's education, employment, property rights, and suffrage. In 1859, Bodichon, along with many female artists including Eliza Fox, Margaret Gillies, and Emily Mary Osborn all signed a petition demanding access for women to the Royal Academy School. Their request was denied, stating that it would require the Royal Academy to develop "separate" life classes. In 1860, Laura Herford, one of the women artists fighting for access, submitted an application to the Royal Academy School using only her initials. She was accepted, much to the embarrassment of the Academy. Herford's enrolment was permitted, and gradually more women artists were accepted in subsequent years.

Grave
It was in a state of disrepair, with railings rusted and breaking away and the tomb inscription scarcely legible. The historian Dr Judith Rowbotham at Nottingham Trent University issued an appeal for funds to restore the grave and its surroundings, which raised about £1,000. The railings were sand-blasted and repainted and the granite tomb was cleaned.

Commemoration
On 30 June 2019, a Blue Plaque jointly commemorating the founders, Barbara Bodichon and Emily Davies, was unveiled at Girton College by Baroness Hale, President of the Supreme Court, as part of the college's 150th anniversary celebrations. The plaque is sited on the main tower at the entrance to Girton, off Huntingdon Road.

See also
History of feminism
Women's suffrage in the United Kingdom
List of Unitarians, Universalists, and Unitarian Universalists

English women painters from the early 19th century who exhibited at the Royal Academy of Art

Sophie Gengembre Anderson
Mary Baker
Ann Charlotte Bartholomew
Maria Bell
Joanna Mary Boyce
Margaret Sarah Carpenter
Fanny Corbaux
Rosa Corder
Mary Ellen Edwards
Harriet Gouldsmith
Mary Harrison (artist)
Jane Benham Hay
Anna Mary Howitt
Mary Moser
Martha Darley Mutrie
Ann Mary Newton
Emily Mary Osborn
Kate Perugini
Louise Rayner
Ellen Sharples
Rolinda Sharples
Rebecca Solomon
Elizabeth Emma Soyer
Isabelle de Steiger
Henrietta Ward

References

Attribution

Further reading

Matthews, Jacquie. Barbara Bodichon: Integrity in diversity (1827–1891) in Spender, Dale (ed.), Feminist theorists: Three centuries of key women thinkers, Pantheon 1983, pp. 90–123

External links
Hastings Press bio of Bodichon
Barbara Bodichon
Girton College Cambridge: Personal Papers of Barbara Leigh Smith Bodichon
Excerpts from an American Diary
The Victorian web: Barbara Leigh Smith (Madame Bodichon) and Hastings

1827 births
1891 deaths
British salon-holders
British women's rights activists
English educational theorists
English feminists
English women painters
English suffragists
English Unitarians
Feminist artists
Orientalist painters
People associated with Girton College, Cambridge
People from Battle, East Sussex
University and college founders
Women of the Victorian era
19th-century British women artists
19th-century English painters
People from Robertsbridge
Founders of colleges of the University of Cambridge